Proximus  may refer to:
 Proximus Group, a Belgian telecommunications company, owner of Proximus
 Proximus, a Belgian mobile phone operator

See also

 Proxima (disambiguation)